A Nice Hot Bath With... is the name of a Crazy Penis album produced in 1999.

Track listing
"Starwar" – 9:00
"Do It Good" – 8:56
"3 Play It Cool" – 6:25
"Omega Man" – 9:57
"Smoothin' Groovin'" – 9:01
"I Am Love" – 5:31
"Mambo" – 8:31
"A Little Something" – 5:26
"Drop Your Weapon" – 8:14

References

1999 debut albums